Iízzwa Iizzalledd Medina Bueso (born July 20, 1982) is a retired Honduran table tennis player.

Career
She represented Honduras at the 2004 Summer Olympics, and later captured three bronze medals, along with her sister Zzwitjhallim in both singles and doubles tournaments at the Central American and Caribbean Games (2006 in Cartagena, Colombia and 2010 in Mayagüez, Puerto Rico). Medina is also right-handed and uses the shakehand grip.

Medina qualified for the women's singles at the 2004 Summer Olympics in Athens by receiving a berth from the Latin American Qualification Tournament in Valdivia, Chile. Building a historic milestone as the first table tennis player from Central America, Medina was appointed by the Honduran Olympic Committee to carry the nation's flag in the opening ceremony. Ranked a lowly 342 in the world, Medina thrashed Jordanian teen Zeina Shaban in their first preliminary round match with a score of 4–0, but was disqualified when the officials ruled the rubber on her racket proved illegal. Through her appeal, the tournament officials decided to allow Medina to recap her match against Shaban with a new racket. Backed by a vocal group of Jordanian supporters, Medina officially lost a cliff-hanging match against Shaban in the seventh and decisive set with a final score of 9–11.

References

1982 births
Living people
Honduran table tennis players
Olympic table tennis players of Honduras
Table tennis players at the 2004 Summer Olympics
Sportspeople from Tegucigalpa
Central American and Caribbean Games bronze medalists for Honduras
Competitors at the 2006 Central American and Caribbean Games
Competitors at the 2010 Central American and Caribbean Games
Central American and Caribbean Games medalists in table tennis